En Uyirinum Melana is a 2007 Indian Tamil-language romance film directed by K. R. Jaya. The film stars newcomers Ajith Chander and Radhika Menon, with S. P. Balasubrahmanyam, Ranjith, Ravikumar, Karunas, Kaka Radhakrishnan, Charuhasan, Fathima Babu and Kamala Kamesh playing supporting roles. The film's musical score was by Deva and was released on 10 August 2007.

Plot
Jeeva is a carefree youth who lives with his parents in Chennai and his father Vijayarangam is a wealthy businessman who spoils him and loves him more than anything. During a trip in Kodaikanal, Jeeva falls under the spell of Priya and gives her a rose for a television show but she slaps him in front of the camera. Later, Priya moves with her family to a house near Jeeva's house in Chennai. One day, Jeeva finds Priya's brother lying in the street after an accident and he admits him to the hospital thus saving his life. Priya thanks Jeeva for the help, they first become friends and they eventually fall in love with each other.

When Priya's father discovers his daughter's love affair, he decides to find her a groom. Thereafter, Priya and her wealthy maternal uncle Vikram from London get engaged. Vijayarangam strongly supports his son's love and he plans to arrange his son's wedding on the same day and at the same wedding hall. With the help of his friends and Priya's brother, Jeeva kidnaps Priya the day of the wedding with a caravan. Priya's father who is an intelligence officer and Vikram try to catch the lovers but they fail. Vijayarangam then meets Priya's father and he successfully convinces him to support their love. The lovers finally come to the wedding hall and Vikram surprisingly supports their love. The film ends with Jeeva and Priya getting married with the blessing of their family.

Cast

Ajith Chander as Jeeva
Radhika Menon as Priya
S. P. Balasubrahmanyam as Vijayarangam, Jeeva's father
Ranjith as Vikram (guest appearance)
Ravikumar as Priya's father
Karunas as Johnny
Kaka Radhakrishnan as Jeeva's grandfather
Charuhasan as Sathyananda Swamy
Fathima Babu as Kamakshi, Jeeva's mother
Kamala Kamesh as Priya's grandmother
Lollu Sabha Balaji as Jeeva's friend
Master Andrew as Priya's brother
Pandu as MP Ramalingam
Sempuli Jagan as MLA Kuzhandai Tamizharasan
Bayilvan Ranganathan as Inspector Munnusamy
Chaplin Balu as Servant
Singamuthu as Singam
Bonda Mani
Nellai Siva
Thadi Balaji as Paramasivam
V. M. Subburaj as Subburaj
Sivanarayanamoorthy
Theni Murugan
Vijay Ganesh
Maayi Sundar
Visalini
Parimala
Master Surya
Kanal Kannan (special appearance in the song Kakka Kakka)

Production
K. R. Jaya who made his directorial debut with Uyirile Kalanthathu (2000) returned with En Uyirinum Melana under the banner of NNT Movie Creations. He had intermittently worked on an unreleased project titled June July in between. Newcomer Ajith Chander, an engineer from Chennai, was cast to play the hero while Radhika Menon from Mumbai was selected to play his love interest. Singer S. P. Balasubrahmanyam signed to play the father role. Kanal Kannan who choreographed the stunts for the film, also played a rowdy and got to sing a gaana song. The songs composed by Deva are all situational, says the director. R. Selva cranked the camera, whereas the editing was by P. C. Mohanan and the art direction by Kiran.

Soundtrack

The film score and the soundtrack were composed by Deva. The soundtrack features 7 tracks written by Vaali, Snehan and Muthu Vijayan.

Reception
A reviewer gave the film a negative review and he criticized the poor plot and weak screenplay.

References

2007 films
2000s Tamil-language films
2007 romantic drama films
Indian romantic drama films
Films scored by Deva (composer)